Pyralis manihotalis is a moth of the family Pyralidae described by Achille Guenée in 1854.

Distribution
It is a widespread, pan-tropical species (Robinson et al., 1994), known from Africa, India, Sri Lanka, China, Taiwan, Thailand, Malaysia, Singapore, Indonesia, the Philippines, Australia, Samoa, Hawaii, South America and the West Indies. It is occasionally recorded from Europe through accidental importation in bones and animal hides.

Description
The wingspan is about 12–20 mm (Robinson et al., 1994; Weinstein & Edwards, 1994; Wang, 2000), although given as a rather generous 24–37 mm in Goater (1986).

Ecology
The larvae feed on a wide range of dead and decaying materials, including stored grain, meal, pulses, dried fruit, bones, animal hides (Goater, 1986; Robinson et al., 1994) and chocolate. Adults are primarily nocturnal, though easily disturbed by day in warehouses; they are attracted to ultraviolet light (Robinson et al., 1994). Weistein and Edwards (1994) found a self-sustaining population of this moth species feeding on bat guano in a cave.

References

External links

"62.0712 [B&F: 1418] Pyralis manihotalis Guenée, 1854". Hantsmoths. Retrieved 22 November 2017.
Weinstein, P. & Edwards, E.D. (1994) "Troglophilic Moths in Australia: First Record of a Self-sustaining Population". Journal of the Australian Entomological Society. 33: 371-319.

Moths described in 1854
Pyralini
Moths of Africa
Moths of Japan
Moths of Madagascar
Moths of Réunion
Moths of Singapore
Pantropical fauna